The Silesian horse, Polish: Koń śląski, Silesian: Ślůnski kůń, is a breed of warmblood horse from the area of historic Silesia, which lies mostly within modern Poland. It is the heaviest of the Polish warmblood breeds, and has been influenced mainly by the Thoroughbred and Oldenburg, and partly by the East Friesian and German halfbred. The Oldenburg influence was particularly pronounced after World War II, when imported stallions were used to keep the breed from becoming extinct. Two types are recognised in the breed standard, an old and a new. The new or racing type is taller and lighter, stallions standing  at the withers and mares about 2 cm less; the girth measures 185–200 cm and the cannon-bone 21.5–23 cm. Stallions average , mares 600 kg. The current stud-book dates from 1961; registers for this type of horse have been kept since the late 19th century. In 2008 the breed numbered about 5000.

References 

Horse breeds
Horse breeds originating in Poland
Warmbloods
Horse breeds originating in Germany
Horse breeds originating in Prussia